The Jackson Free Press, referred to often as simply "JFP", is a for-profit community magazine available free of charge at various retail establishments in Jackson, Mississippi founded in 2002 and owned by Mississippi native Donna Ladd and author and technology expert Todd Stauffer. It is currently the only member of the Association of Alternative Newsweeklies (AAN) in the state of Mississippi. It is known locally for its annual Best of Jackson awards as nominated by its readers and its online political blogs. It also has sponsored numerous local events such as the Fondren ArtMix, JubileeJam, the Chick Ball, the "Race, Religion & Society Series" and the Crossroads Film Festival.

The publication's name is based on the Mississippi Free Press, a civil rights movement newspaper started by a multiracial coalition including Medgar Evers, Rev. R.L.T. Smith, and printed by white newspaper publisher Hazel Brannon Smith.

In its first four years of publication, JFP won 14 national writing awards from the Association of Alternative Newsweeklies.

In July 2005, a team of JFP journalists, led by editor Donna Ladd, joined Thomas Moore and Canadian Broadcasting Corporation filmmaker David Ridgen in a trip to Moore's hometown of Meadville, Mississippi to investigate and call for justice for the 1964 KKK murders of his brother Charles, and his friend Henry Dee. In the paper's story about the trip, published July 20, 2005, JFP revealed that the lead suspect, James Ford Seale, was alive and living in the area, although other media outlets had reported that he was no longer alive. In January 2007, the Justice Department announced that Seale had been indicted for federal kidnapping and conspiracy charges in connection with the case.

The publication has also attracted attention with its dogged coverage of Jackson mayor Frank Melton. JFP's Adam Lynch broke the story on the publication's web site that the mayor had taken a group of young men to bust up an alleged "drughouse" with sledgehammers. That revelation led to the indictment of the mayor and his bodyguards on multiple criminal charges. They were eventually found not guilty of any criminal wrongdoing by a jury.

The Jackson Free Press launched its active Web site with multiple blogs in 2002. As the publication is a twice a month magazine, the website provides immediate breaking news and forums for discussions on news appearing in the print version and topics posted by readers.

In 2006, the JFP joined with eight other publishers in the Jackson area to form the Mississippi Independent Publishers Alliance (MIPA) to challenge the Gannett Corp.'s TDN distribution scheme to control local distribution. The JFP's efforts to fight the scheme, which was blasted by Editor & Publisher magazine as a violation of independent publication's First Amendment rights, was written up in media across the country. JFP started a blog called the Goliath Blog to chronicle MIPA's successes in the battle and the national media coverage of the issue. MIPA efforts led to an investigation of the strategy by Mississippi Attorney General Jim Hood.

In 2022, the JFP's journalism assets were sold by Jackson Free Press, Inc., to the Mississippi Journalism and Education Group, a Mississippi non-profit corporation that owns and operates the Mississippi Free Press, and statewide journalism outlet founded by Jackson Free Press co-founder Donna Ladd and former Jackson Free Press Associate Publisher Kimberly Griffin.

See also

 List of alternative weekly newspapers

References

External links

 

Newspapers published in Mississippi
Mass media in Jackson, Mississippi